Tihomir Ivaylov Ivanov (Bulgarian: Тихомир Ивайлов Иванов; born 11 July 1994) is a Bulgarian athlete specialising in the high jump. He won a gold medal at the 2019 Summer Universiade in Naples.

He has personal bests of 2.31 metres outdoors (London 2017) and 2.28 metres indoors (Banská Bystrica & Beograd 2017).

Competition record

1No mark in the final

References

1994 births
Living people
Bulgarian male high jumpers
Athletes (track and field) at the 2016 Summer Olympics
Athletes (track and field) at the 2020 Summer Olympics
Olympic athletes of Bulgaria
Sportspeople from Pleven
Universiade gold medalists in athletics (track and field)
Universiade gold medalists for Bulgaria
Medalists at the 2019 Summer Universiade
European Games competitors for Bulgaria
Athletes (track and field) at the 2019 European Games